Rajapaksha Mudiyanselage Vishmi Dewmini Gunarathne (born 22 August 2005, known as Vishmi Gunaratne) is a Sri Lankan cricketer who currently plays for Chilaw Marians Cricket Club and Sri Lanka. She plays as a right-handed batter.

Domestic career
In 2022, playing for Rathnavali Balika Vidyalaya School, Gunaratne scored the first ever quadruple century in Sri Lanka Girls' cricket, scoring 417 from 128 balls against Jayasiripura KV.

Gunaratne played for Chilaw Marians Cricket Club during the 2021–22 Sri Lanka Women's Division One Tournament, and scored 138* in her side's match against Sri Lanka Army Sports Club Second XI.

International career
In October 2021, Gunaratne was selected in Sri Lanka's squad for the 2021 Women's Cricket World Cup Qualifier, but did not play a match.

Gunaratne made her Twenty20 International debut on 18 January 2022, at the 2022 Commonwealth Games Cricket Qualifier against Scotland, opening the batting and scoring 8 runs. She missed Sri Lanka's tour of Pakistan in order to sit exams.

During Sri Lanka's series against India in June and July 2022, she made her WT20I high score, scoring 45 as part of Sri Lanka's record opening partnership in WT20Is (87, made with Chamari Athapaththu). She made her One Day International debut on 4 July 2022, during the same series. Gunaratne was selected as part of Sri Lanka's squad for the 2022 Commonwealth Games, playing two matches in the tournament.

In January 2023, Gunaratne was named in Sri Lanka's squad for the 2023 ICC Under-19 Women's T20 World Cup, as captain of the side. She was Sri Lanka's leading run-scorer in the tournament, with 134 runs at an average of 44.66. In February 2023, she played four matches for Sri Lanka at the 2023 ICC Women's T20 World Cup, scoring 60 runs.

References

External links
 
 

2005 births
Living people
Place of birth missing (living people)
Sri Lankan women cricketers
Sri Lanka women One Day International cricketers
Sri Lanka women Twenty20 International cricketers
Cricketers at the 2022 Commonwealth Games
Commonwealth Games competitors for Sri Lanka